Leonhard "Leo" Götz (1883 – 3 November 1962) was a German painter.

Biography
Born in Weiden in der Oberpfalz, he studied painting and sketching in Nuremberg and Munich. At the Royal Bavarian Academie of Pictorial Arts, where Franz von Stuck was professor at this time, he was fellow of Martin von Feuerstein and Adolf Hengeler, two Art Nouveau artists and well known professors. In 1914 he moved to Hof/Saale. From 1914 to 1918 he joined the German Army and fought at the western front. During that time he painted several postcards for the imperial army. From 1918 until 1962 he lived in Hof/Saale, where he died on 3 November 1962.

His most famous works have been the decoration of the church of St. Mary in Hof/Saale in 1925, the war memorials at the chapel of Marlesreuth, the paintings for the entrance hall at the former Panda shoe manufacture in Naila.

See also
 List of German painters

External links
www.goetz-leo.de

References

1883 births
1962 deaths
People from Weiden in der Oberpfalz
20th-century German painters
20th-century German male artists
German male painters
Modern painters